Inchelium is a census-designated place (CDP) in Ferry County, Washington, United States on the Colville Indian Reservation. The population was 431 at the 2020 Census.

Inchelium was relocated from an earlier site in the early 1940s. Old Inchelium had been located on the banks of the Columbia River before the construction of the Grand Coulee Dam. As the waters rose behind the dam, the town had to be moved. A description of life in the last years of Old Inchelium and of the move can be found in Lawney Reyes' memoir White Grizzly Bear's Legacy: Learning to be Indian and his history/memoir B Street: The Notorious Playground of Coulee Dam.

Inchelium is the demographic heart of the Inchelium School District and the Confederated Tribes of the Colville Reservation Inchelium Legislative District

Geography
Inchelium is located at  (48.313214, -118.221681).

According to the United States Census Bureau, the CDP has a total area of 26.5 square miles (68.8 km2), of which, 26.5 square miles (68.7 km2) of it is land and 0.04 square miles (0.1 km2) of it (0.11%) is water.

Climate
According to the Köppen Climate Classification system, Inchelium has a dry-summer Humid continental climate, abbreviated "Dsb" on climate maps.

Demographics from Census 2010
As of the census of 2010, there were 409 people residing in Inchelium.

The racial makeup of the CDP was 78.5% Native American, 14.2% White, 5.6% from two or more races, 1.5% from other races, and 0.2% Native Hawaiian/Pacific Islander. Hispanic or Latino of any race were 5.1% of the population.

Residents under the age of eighteen made up 27.4% of the population versus 72.6% of the population which was eighteen and older.

Demographics from Census 2000

As of the census of 2000, there were 389 people, 153 households, and 95 families residing in the CDP. The population density was 14.7 people per square mile (5.7/km2). There were 168 housing units at an average density of 6.3/sq mi (2.4/km2). The racial makeup of the CDP was 20.31% White, 76.61% Native American, 0.26% from other races, and 2.83% from two or more races. Hispanic or Latino of any race were 1.54% of the population. 6.5% were of German ancestry according to Census 2000. 100.0% spoke English as their first language.

There were 153 households, out of which 30.7% had children under the age of 18 living with them, 32.7% were married couples living together, 18.3% had a female householder with no husband present, and 37.3% were non-families. 32.0% of all households were made up of individuals, and 13.7% had someone living alone who was 65 years of age or older. The average household size was 2.54 and the average family size was 3.31.

In the CDP, the age distribution of the population shows 29.6% under the age of 18, 9.8% from 18 to 24, 26.5% from 25 to 44, 23.7% from 45 to 64, and 10.5% who were 65 years of age or older. The median age was 33 years. For every 100 females, there were 103.7 males. For every 100 females age 18 and over, there were 110.8 males.

The median income for a household in the CDP was $24,375, and the median income for a family was $42,000. Males had a median income of $37,292 versus $23,194 for females. The per capita income for the CDP was $14,728. About 11.0% of families and 13.4% of the population were below the poverty line, including 4.8% of those under age 18 and 26.3% of those age 65 or over.

References

Census-designated places in Ferry County, Washington
Census-designated places in Washington (state)
Populated places in the Okanagan Country
Washington (state) populated places on the Columbia River